Yuliya Beygelzimer and Renata Voráčová were the defending champions, having won the event in 2012, but both players chose not to defend their title.

Vanesa Furlanetto and Amandine Hesse won the tournament, defeating Ana Konjuh and Silvia Njirić in the final, 7–6(7–3), 6–4.

Seeds

Draw

References 
 Draw

Open 88 Contrexeville - Doubles